Shlomi Vilner (2 February 1978 – 4 November 2009) was an Israeli footballer.

He was the son of Yehuda Vilner and the older brother of Liron Vilner, who also played for Maccabi Netanya.

References

1978 births
2009 deaths
21st-century Israeli Jews
Israeli footballers
Maccabi Netanya F.C. players
Hapoel Nir Ramat HaSharon F.C. players
Hapoel Bat Yam F.C. players
Footballers from Netanya
Association football midfielders